Per Kristian Worre Bråtveit (born 15 February 1996) is a Norwegian professional footballer who plays as a goalkeeper for AGF.

Club career

Early career
In his youth, Bråtveit spent time with SK Djerv before moving to Haugesund.

Haugesund
He made his senior debut for Haugesund on 9 June 2014 against Strømsgodset; Haugesund lost 2–1.

Djurgården
On 19 December 2018, he signed for Djurgårdens IF. He made his debut in the first game of the 2019 season against GIF Sundsvall on 1 April.

Career statistics

Club

Honours
Djurgårdens IF
Allsvenskan: 2019

References

External links

1996 births
Living people
People from Haugesund
Norwegian footballers
Norway international footballers
Norway under-21 international footballers
Norway youth international footballers
Association football goalkeepers
Eliteserien players
Allsvenskan players
SK Djerv 1919 players
FK Haugesund players
Vålerenga Fotball players
Djurgårdens IF Fotboll players
Nîmes Olympique players
Aarhus Gymnastikforening players
Norwegian expatriate footballers
Norwegian expatriate sportspeople in Sweden
Expatriate footballers in Sweden
Norwegian expatriate sportspeople in France
Expatriate footballers in France
Norwegian expatriate sportspeople in Denmark
Expatriate men's footballers in Denmark
Sportspeople from Rogaland